The Ruja is a left tributary of the river Tazlăul Sărat in Romania. It discharges into the Tazlăul Sărat in Șesuri.

References

Rivers of Romania
Rivers of Bacău County